Abd ol Hoseyni (also Romanized as ‘Abd ol Ḩoseynī and ‘Abd ol Ḩoseyn; also known as ‘Abd Ḩoseynī) is a village in Khaveh-ye Jonubi Rural District, in the Central District of Delfan County, Lorestan Province, Iran. At the 2006 census, its population was 476, in 99 families.

References 

Towns and villages in Delfan County